Adenosine Tri-Phosphate is a Japanese alternative rock/pop band. The group's name was suggested to the band from a fan. The concept of Adenosine Tri-Phosphate is powerful music with musical experiments.

The group began with the guitarist, Mug, who is the lead composer, plays guitar, and also plays other instruments. He has been described as a sonic and experimental guitarist. He is a student at University of Chicago. After Mug's band, "African Tribe Punk" broke up, he started to run the Bazooka Recording Studio in Japan. He later invited Taata, also a graduate of the University of Chicago, to join him as a vocalist and keyboardist in Adenosine Tri-Phosphate. In 1993, Adenosine Tri-Phosphate was formed in Tokyo. Drummer Kaz and bassist Kohei joined the band in 1995.

ATP draws their inspiration from everyday life and is always seeking to be in the alternative scene. Their music contains a multitude of different sounds of percussion, vocals, and guitars, but is also described as having a strong composition and attitude.

With their debut of the CD Sun Dancer, ATP was hosted on the national Japanese TV shows Zeus' Holiday and Jaka-Jan. The program Dash/Dash regarded ATP as the best band in Japanese alternative music. In 1996, the producer Crane got ATP a record deal with BMG/Vivid. For two years after the release of Sun Dancer the band took a break to experiment and record new music while their producer, Crane, became seriously ill. The band resumed normal performances in 1998. That same year, the group produced the album Aroused Zen that included work from the two year performance break. The chairman of MP3.com called ATP “the greatest unknown band from Asia, and a good example of internet possibility.” Due to this ATP became big overseas, and had their first overseas tour through Asia in 2000.

In 2001, ATP produced the soundtrack to the anime movie Guilstein. In 2002, they toured through Japan. After this, the group took another two year performance break and produced 50 new songs. The first tour in the US was in 2005 in California. Their most recent album, Welcome to my Psychedelic World, was finished in 2010.

Adenosine Tri-Phosphate's discography includes Sun Dancer, Aroused Zen Monk, Deranged Angel (2000), A Wish Away (2007), and Welcome to my Psychedelic World (2010), and their compilations are Unquiet Grave: Unearthing the Underground (2001) and Rock In Asia (2007).

Discography

References

Japanese rock music groups
Musical groups from Tokyo